Henry P. McKean, Jr. (born 1930 in Wenham, Massachusetts) is an American mathematician at the Courant Institute in New York University. He works in various areas of analysis. He obtained his PhD in 1955 from Princeton University under William Feller.

He was elected to the National Academy of Sciences in 1980. In 2007 he was awarded the Leroy P. Steele Prize for his life's work. In 1978 he was an invited speaker at the International Congress of Mathematicians in Helsinki (Algebraic curves of infinite genus arising in the theory of nonlinear waves). In 2012 he became a fellow of the American Mathematical Society.

His doctoral students include Michael Arbib, Luigi Chierchia, Harry Dym, Daniel Stroock, Eugene Trubowitz, Victor Moll and Pierre van Moerbeke and Uri Keich.

Works

Selected articles

Books
with Kiyosi Itô: Diffusion processes and their sample paths. Springer 1965.
Stochastic Integrals. New York 1969.
with Harry Dym: Fourier series and integrals. New York 1972.
with Harry Dym: Gaussian processes, function theory and the inverse spectral problem, Academic Press 1976
with Victor Moll: Elliptic Curves. Cambridge 1997.
Probability: The Classical Limit Theorems, Cambridge University Press, 2014

See also 
McKean's theorem

References

External links

Princeton University alumni
Courant Institute of Mathematical Sciences faculty
Members of the United States National Academy of Sciences
Fellows of the American Mathematical Society
20th-century American mathematicians
21st-century American mathematicians
Probability theorists
1930 births
Living people